Antonio Jesús Regal Angulo (born 11 December 1987), commonly known as Antoñito, is a Spanish professional footballer who plays as either a right-back or a midfielder for Deportivo de La Coruña.

Club career
Born in Herrera, Seville, Antoñito graduated from Polideportivo Ejido's youth academy, and made his senior debut in the 2006–07 season with the reserves, in the Tercera División. On 4 November 2007 he played his first match as a professional, coming on as a second-half substitute in a 4–1 Segunda División away loss against UD Salamanca.

On 26 January 2008, Antoñito was loaned to Segunda División B club UD Melilla until June. After returning to Poli he became a regular for the Andalusians, now in the third division.

Antoñito continued to compete in division three the following years, representing UD Almería B, Écija Balompié and FC Cartagena. On 23 June 2014 he signed a two-year contract with Albacete Balompié, newly promoted to the second tier.

Antoñito scored his first professional goal on 6 February 2016, netting his team's second in a 2–2 home draw against Real Oviedo. On 13 July, after suffering relegation, he joined Córdoba CF of the same league.

On 8 July 2017, Antoñito was transferred to Real Valladolid on a three-year deal. He contributed 38 appearances in his first year – play-offs included – helping to a La Liga promotion after four years.

Antoñito made his debut in the Spanish top flight on 27 September 2018, playing 21 minutes in 2–1 home victory over Levante UD. He scored his first goal on 21 October, at Real Betis (1–0). He appeared in 30 matches during the season in a 16th-place finish, and subsequently agreed to an extension until June 2021.

On 26 September 2020, aged 32, Antoñito joined Super League Greece club Panathinaikos F.C. on a two-year contract. The following 14 January, after failing to make an appearance, he returned to his home country with Cartagena, now in the second division.

On 31 January 2022, after only 53 minutes in four league matches, Antoñito terminated his link at the Estadio Cartagonova.

References

External links

1987 births
Living people
People from Sierra Sur (Seville)
Sportspeople from the Province of Seville
Spanish footballers
Footballers from Andalusia
Association football defenders
Association football midfielders
La Liga players
Segunda División players
Segunda División B players
Tercera División players
Primera Federación players
Polideportivo Ejido footballers
UD Melilla footballers
UD Almería B players
Écija Balompié players
FC Cartagena footballers
Albacete Balompié players
Córdoba CF players
Real Valladolid players
Deportivo de La Coruña players
Super League Greece players
Panathinaikos F.C. players
Spanish expatriate footballers
Expatriate footballers in Greece
Spanish expatriate sportspeople in Greece